Leili Echghi  is an Iranian sociologist. She is known for her works on Iranian revolution.

Works
Un temps entre les temps. L'Imam, le chi'isme et l'Iran, introduction by Christian Jambet, Paris : les editions du Cerf, 1992
 Shi'isme et temporalité
 Tensions culturelles dans une société en changement économique: Téhéran 1975
 Islam et libération des peuples musulmans Paris Inodep 1984

References

Living people
Iranian sociologists
Iranian women sociologists
Paris Descartes University alumni
Year of birth missing (living people)